Awford is an English surname. Notable people with the surname include:

 Andy Awford (born 1972), English footballer and coach
 Nick Awford (born 1995), English footballer

See also
 Afford (surname)
 Alford (surname)
 Ford (disambiguation)

English-language surnames